Jordan High School (also referred to as  Jordan High  or  JHS ) is a public high school located in Sandy, Utah (United States) It is one  of five high schools in the Canyons School District. The school was established in 1907, making it one of the oldest public high schools in the state of Utah.

Timeline

1907–1914
Jordan High School took root when a student body of just seven students led by Weston Morley began meeting in the basement of a church in Midvale. His small group began to grow in numbers and began to give him money. The enrollment numbers quickly grew, and soon it was necessary to move the students and faculty into their first real school building.  This original school was initially known as The People's College because it was open to students of all ages.   After a year, this small college became a student body of 2,000 students.

1914–1996
A new Jordan High School opened at 9351 South State Street.  The original building was on the National Register of Historic Places. Jordan Commons Movie Theatre is now at the old location of Jordan High School.

1996–present
The current campus for Jordan High School is at 95 E. Beetdigger Blvd. (9880 S.). It can serve 2,600 students.

Centennial (2007)
The school celebrated its centennial birthday in 2007.  This huge two-day event to celebrate 100 years of education at Jordan High took place from 6 July through 7 July 2007.

Academics

Jordan High School is ranked 15th in Utah on the college readiness index, and 20th in the state on the college curriculum breadth index according to US News The average ACT (test) score for Jordan students is 25, and the school’s average SAT score is 1150  The school has produced several National Merit Scholar award recipients, finalists and semifinalists as well as Utah State Sterling Scholar finalists.

Mascot
Jordan High School students are known as ‘Beetdiggers’. This is due to the fact that large areas once surrounding the school were composed of sugar beet fields. Up until about 1950, at harvest time, classes were usually cancelled during vacations of a week or two in October, which allowed students to assist with the harvest. Their mascot is known as ‘Digger Dan’.

Notable alumni

Dee Benson - professional soccer player; Federal judge
Don Fullmer - boxer, contender for World Middleweight Championship
Gene Fullmer - World Middleweight Boxing Champion, 1957–62
Hal Hale - professional basketball player
Andy Jones - professional acrobat; member USA High Diving Team, 2014 
Austin Kafentzis - Utah Mr. Football (2012); MaxPreps National Freshman and Sophomore of the Year; 2012 & 2014 Utah Gatorade Player of the Year; played college football for the BYU Cougars
Tyler Larsen - NFL football center
Don Lind - NASA astronaut
S. Floyd Mori - California state legislator and educator
Dick Motta - NBA basketball coach; 13th all time in career wins; won the 1978 NBA Finals with the Washington Bullets
Sean O'Connell (fighter) - former wrestler and football player; professional Mixed Martial Artist

References

External links

 Official school site
 Jordan High Alumni Association - raising scholarships for current Beetdiggers and sponsoring the Jordan High Centennial Celebration
 JordanAlumni.com - A hub for finding class reunions and class websites
 Canyons School District

Public high schools in Utah
Educational institutions established in 1907
Schools in Salt Lake County, Utah
1907 establishments in Utah
Buildings and structures in Sandy, Utah